Laheriasarai railway station, (station code: LSI), is the railway station serving Laheriasarai in the Darbhanga district in the Indian state of Bihar. The laheriasarai railway station is connected to most of the major cities in India by the railway network.

Laheriasarai has trains running frequently to Sitamarhi and Kolkata.

Platforms
There are three platforms in Laheriasarai railway station. The platforms are interconnected with one foot overbridge (FOB).

Trains
Laheriasarai Junction railway station is a station of the East Central Railways. It is located on the Samastipur to Darbhanga rail route.

Nearest airports
The nearest airports to Laheriasarai Station is:
  Darbhanga Airport,  Darbhanga

See also
 Darbhanga

References

External links
 Wikimapia.org

Railway stations in Darbhanga district
Samastipur railway division